Hiroyuki Ikawa (井川 寛之, born 26 July 1988) is a Japanese sport shooter. He competed in the 2020 Summer Olympics.

References

1988 births
Living people
Sportspeople from Yokohama
Shooters at the 2020 Summer Olympics
Japanese male sport shooters
Olympic shooters of Japan
21st-century Japanese people